Leslie Township is a township in Todd County, Minnesota, United States. The population was 690 at the 2000 census.

Leslie Township was organized in 1876, and named for John B. Leslie, an early settler. Part of the village of Clotho is in the northern part of the township.

Geography
According to the United States Census Bureau, the township has a total area of 36.2 square miles (93.8 km2), of which 34.5 square miles (89.4 km2) is land and 1.7 square miles (4.4 km2) (4.67%) is water.

Demographics
As of the census of 2000, there were 690 people, 287 households, and 198 families residing in the township.  The population density was 20.0 people per square mile (7.7/km2).  There were 619 housing units at an average density of 17.9/sq mi (6.9/km2).  The racial makeup of the township was 97.10% White, 0.58% Native American, 2.17% Asian, and 0.14% from two or more races. Hispanic or Latino of any race were 0.58% of the population.

There were 287 households, out of which 21.6% had children under the age of 18 living with them, 64.1% were married couples living together, 3.5% had a female householder with no husband present, and 30.7% were non-families. 25.8% of all households were made up of individuals, and 9.1% had someone living alone who was 65 years of age or older.  The average household size was 2.40 and the average family size was 2.92.

In the township the population was spread out, with 23.6% under the age of 18, 3.9% from 18 to 24, 19.6% from 25 to 44, 35.4% from 45 to 64, and 17.5% who were 65 years of age or older.  The median age was 47 years. For every 100 females, there were 119.7 males.  For every 100 females age 18 and over, there were 111.6 males.

The median income for a household in the township was $31,324, and the median income for a family was $40,000. Males had a median income of $30,938 versus $22,000 for females. The per capita income for the township was $21,344.  About 9.9% of families and 7.6% of the population were below the poverty line, including 2.7% of those under age 18 and 17.4% of those age 65 or over.

References

Townships in Todd County, Minnesota
Townships in Minnesota